was a town located in Minamiakita District, Akita Prefecture, Japan.

In 2003, the town had an estimated population of 8,685 and a density of 213.65 persons per km². The total area was 40.65 km².

On March 22, 2005, Shōwa, along with the towns of Iitagawa and Tennō (all from Minamiakita District), merged to create the city of Katagami.

Noted people from Showa
Ikuo Nakamura, photographer
Kazushi Sakuraba, mixed martial artist
Kenichi Takahashi (basketball), basketball player

External links
 Shōwa official website  (Archive)
 Katagami official website 

Dissolved municipalities of Akita Prefecture
Katagami, Akita